George Bedborough Higgs (10 January 1868 – 7 August 1940) was an English bookseller, journalist and writer who advocated for a number of causes, including sex reform, freethought, secularism, eugenics, animal rights, vegetarianism, and free love. He was the secretary of the Legitimation League and editor of the League's publication The Adult: A Journal for the Advancement of freedom in Sexual Relationships. Bedborough was convicted for obscenity in 1898, after being caught selling a book on homosexuality; the case of Regina v. Bedborough, has also been referred to as the Bedborough trial or Bedborough case.

Biography

Early life and education 
George Bedborough Higgs was born in St Giles, London, on 10 January 1868. His father was a retired Church of England preacher and his mother was a poet. He was educated at Dulwich College and began work at the age of 16, founding the Workhouse Aid Society with W. T. Stead. Bedborough later attended university.

In 1887, Bedborough was present at Bloody Sunday, in Trafalgar Square. He later wrote for a number of publications including the Sunday Chronicle, Shafts (a feminist magazine), University Magazine, the Newcastle Weekly Chronicle and South London Mail. Bedborough was a close friend and collaborator with Henry S. Salt, Bertram Dobell and Ernest Bell.

From 1891 to 1892, Bedborough was a member of the National Society of Lanternists. He also occasionally worked as a lantern operator and gave lectures.

Bedborough was a member of the Legitimation League and edited its journal The Adult between 1897 and 1898; the League advocated for the legitimation of illegitimate children and free love. He married for the sake of his family and had an open relationship with his wife Louie. She was the treasurer of the League.

Regina v. Bedborough 
On 31 May 1898, Bedborough was arrested, along with the sex-radical feminist Lillian Harman and charged with obscenity for attempting to "corrupt the morals of Her Majesty's Subjects". He was indicated on 11 counts, including selling a copy of Studies in the Psychology of Sex Vol. 2, a book on homosexuality, by Havelock Ellis, to an undercover agent, as well as selling other pamphlets considered to be indecent, including one by Oswald Dawson, the founder of the Legitimation League. He was also indicated for his articles published in The Adult. Bedborough had been under surveillance because of the suspected anarchist connections of the League; Bedborough, himself, was not an anarchist.

A Free Speech Defence Committee was formed to attempt to fight the case; members included Henry Seymour, Frank Harris, Edward Carpenter, George Bernard Shaw, G. W. Foote, Mona Caird and Grant Allen. Just before being prosecuted, Bedborough collaborated with the police and pled guilty on three counts. This led the committee to denounce him and publish the details of the case. On 31 October 1898, Bedborough was fined £100, for selling Ellis' book. He agreed to no longer be associated with the League or The Adult, writing in the December issue "I adhere to my resolution not to excuse myself. I am a coward […] I thank Henry Seymour, Mr. Foote, and others with all my heart and soul for their work, which I have requited illy indeed".

Later life and career 
Bedborough became a vegetarian, in 1902, after Moses Harman visited his home and suggested they visit meat-packing houses to see if Bedborough would remain a meat-eater. In 1906, Bedborough became the editor of The Children's Realm, a children's magazine published by the Vegetarian Federal Union and London Vegetarian Society, remaining as editor for the majority of its existence; the magazine ceased publication in 1914.

Bedborough was a contributor to the American Journal of Eugenics, published between 1907 and 1910. He was also an active member of the discussion circles of the feminist journal The Freewoman, which was published between 1911 and 1912.

Bedborough published three books of aphorisms, Narcotics and a Few Stimulants, Vacant Chaff Well Meant for Grain and Subtilty to the Simple and one book of Epigrams, Vulgar Fractions. In 1914, Bedborough published Stories from the Children's Realm, a children's story book with animal rights, anti-vivisection and vegetarian themes; it contained several illustrations by L. A. Hayter, former illustrator and contributor to The Children's Realm. Bedborough published The Atheist in 1919, a poem which advocated for atheism and was critical of the killing of animals for human consumption; it was dedicated to Anatole France.

During the 1920s and 30s, Bedborough reconnected with the secular movement, writing for The Freethinker, he published an attack on the Ku Klux Klan in 1936 and a reflection on Havelock Ellis after his death in 1939. He also contributed to the Birth Control Review. In 1934, he published Arms and the Clergy, a compilation of clerical declarations made during the First World War. His last work Prayer: An Indictment, published in 1938, was a secular criticism of prayer.

Bedborough died in Cambridge, on 7 August 1940.

Selected publications 
 Narcotics and a Few Stimulants (1913)
 Vacant Chaff Well Meant for Grain (1914)
 Stories from the "Children's Realm" (Vegetarian Federal Union, 1914)
 Wordsworth: A Lecture (Letchworth: Garden City Press, 1913)
 The Bright Side and Other Verses (Letchworth: Garden City Press, 1915)
 The Dogs of War, and Other Stories (Letchworth: Garden City Press, 1915)
 Vulgar Fractions (Letchworth: Garden City Press, 1915)
 Subtilty to the Simple (Letchworth: Garden City Press, 1916)
 Harmony or Humbug? An examination of Mr. Ralph Waldo Trine's book "In Tune with the Infinite." (Letchworth: Garden City Press, 1917)
 Love and Happiness: Letters to Tolstoy, Written in 1897 and Now First Published (Letchworth: Garden City Press, 1917)
 Sayings of George Bedborough (Letchworth: Garden City Press, 1917)
 The Will to Love (Letchworth: Garden City Press, 1917)
 Dark Sayings, with Some Fair Ones (Letchworth: Garden City Press, 1918)
 Not Only Men (Letchworth: Garden City Press, 1918)
 The Atheist (Letchworth: Garden City Press, 1919)
 Arms and the Clergy, 1914–1918 (London: Pioneer Press, 1934)
 Prayer: An Indictment (London: Pioneer Press, 1938)

Notes

References

Further reading

External links 
 

1868 births
1940 deaths
19th-century British journalists
19th-century English male writers
19th-century English poets
20th-century British journalists
20th-century English male writers
20th-century English poets
Aphorists
Atheist writers
Anti-vivisectionists
British birth control activists
British secularists
British vegetarianism activists
English animal rights activists
English atheists
English booksellers
English children's writers
English eugenicists
English feminist writers
English reformers
Free love advocates
English LGBT rights activists
Male feminists
People convicted of obscenity
People educated at Dulwich College
People from London
Sex education advocates